Negatron may refer to:

 Electron, a subatomic particle formerly and occasionally known as negatron
 Negatron (album), a musical album by Canadian metal band Voivod
 Negatron, a four element vacuum tube which displays a negative resistance characteristic